Minlaton is a town in central Yorke Peninsula, South Australia. At the 2016 census, Minlaton had a population of 800. It is known as the "Barley capital of the world", due to the rich Barley production in the region.

Minlaton was the hometown of Harry Butler, a World War I flying ace. His Bristol M1C monoplane has been restored and is preserved in pride of place in a building the centre of the town. When he flew an air mail run from Adelaide across Gulf St Vincent to Minlaton in 1919, it was the first over-water flight in the Southern Hemisphere.

Minlaton is in the District Council of Yorke Peninsula, the federal Division of Grey and the state electoral district of Narungga.

Climate
Minlaton, like most of the Yorke Peninsula, has a dry mediterranean climate bordering on semi-arid.

Gallery

See also
List of cities and towns in South Australia

References

External links 

 Yorke Peninsula: Minlaton
 Harvest Corner website Yorke Peninsula Visitor Information Centre at Minlaton

Towns in South Australia
Yorke Peninsula